Round Lake Beach is a station on Metra's North Central Service in Round Lake Beach, Illinois. In Metra's zone-based fare system, Round Lake Beach is in zone J. As of 2018, Round Lake Beach is the 184th busiest of Metra's 236 non-downtown stations, with an average of 111 weekday boardings.

Round Lake Beach station is a brick-and-stucco enclosed structure with a gabled roof, a cupola, and two glass-enclosed canopies on both sides. A 19th-century-style street light can be found next to the station in the parking lot.

As of December 12, 2022, Round Lake Beach is served by all 14 trains (seven in each direction) on weekdays.

References

External links 

Metra stations in Illinois
Railway stations in Lake County, Illinois
1996 establishments in Illinois
Railway stations in the United States opened in 1996